Duke of Northumberland is a noble title that has been created three times in English and British history, twice in the Peerage of England and once in the Peerage of Great Britain. The current holder of this title is Ralph Percy, 12th Duke of Northumberland.

1551 creation
The title was first created in the Peerage of England in 1551 for John Dudley, 1st Earl of Warwick. He had already been created Viscount Lisle in 1543 and Earl of Warwick in 1547, also in the Peerage of England. In 1553, Dudley advanced the claim of his daughter-in-law, Lady Jane Grey, to the English throne, but when she was deposed by Queen Mary I, Dudley was convicted of high treason and executed. An illegitimate son of one of his younger sons, Robert Dudley, 1st Earl of Leicester, Sir Robert Dudley, claimed the dukedom when in exile in Italy. On 9 March 1620 the Emperor Ferdinand II officially recognised the title, an act which infuriated James I of England.

1683 creation
George FitzRoy, 1st Earl of Northumberland, an illegitimate son of king Charles II, was created Duke of Northumberland in the Peerage of England in 1683. He had already been created Baron of Pontefract, Viscount Falmouth and Earl of Northumberland in 1674, also in the Peerage of England. However, all the titles became extinct on his death in 1716 as he left no heirs.

Jacobite creation
In 1716 Philip Wharton, 1st Duke of Wharton, was created Duke of Northumberland, Marquess of Woburn, Earl of Malmesbury and Viscount Winchendon in the Jacobite Peerage, by the Old Pretender. The title had no legal validity in the Kingdom of Great Britain.

1766 creation 
 

The title was created for the third time in 1766 for Hugh Percy, 2nd Earl of Northumberland (formerly Sir Hugh Smithson, 4th Baronet), who had assumed by Act of Parliament in 1750 for himself and his descendants the surname Percy, due to his having married in 1740 the daughter of Algernon Seymour, 7th Duke of Somerset (1684–1750), whose mother
Lady Elizabeth Percy (1667–1722) was the last of the senior blood line of the ancient House of Percy, being the only surviving child of Josceline Percy, 11th Earl of Northumberland (1644–1670). In 1749 King George II created Algernon (who had inherited the Dukedom of Somerset in 1748) Earl of Northumberland and Baron Warkworth, of Warkworth Castle in the County of Northumberland, with special remainder to his son-in-law Sir Hugh Smithson, 4th Baronet.

The above steps formed a deliberate move to allow ancient names and titles of the Percys to be revived in the male-heir exhausted senior branch of the Dukedom of Somerset, which at that time was about to see its largest removal – to another noble but very cadet branch (a fourth cousin) on Algernon's death. Algernon was also created Earl of Egremont at the same time, with a different remainder.

In 1784 the 1st Duke was also granted the substantive title Lord Lovaine, Baron of Alnwick in the County of Northumberland, in the Peerage of Great Britain, with remainder to his second son Lord Algernon Percy, who succeeded and who was created Earl of Beverley in 1790, and thus it too became a courtesy title.

The 1st Duke was succeeded in the dukedom and associated titles by his eldest son, Hugh, the 2nd Duke, a lieutenant-general in the British Army. The 2nd Duke was in his turn succeeded by his eldest son, Hugh, the 3rd Duke, who in 1812, five years before he succeeded in the dukedom, had been summoned to the House of Lords through a writ of acceleration in his father's junior title of Baron Percy. The 3rd Duke later held office as Lord-Lieutenant of Ireland from 1829 to 1830. He was childless and was succeeded by his younger brother, Algernon, 1st Baron Prudhoe, the 4th Duke, who in 1814 had been created Baron Prudhoe, of Prudhoe Castle in the County of Northumberland, in the Peerage of the United Kingdom. The 4th Duke was an admiral in the Royal Navy and notably served as First Lord of the Admiralty in 1852. He was also childless and on his death in 1865 the barony of Prudhoe became extinct while the barony of Percy (which could be passed on through the female line) was inherited by his great-nephew, John Stewart-Murray, 7th Duke of Atholl. The Admiral was succeeded in the dukedom and remaining titles by his first cousin, George, the 2nd Earl of Beverley, eldest son of the second son of the 1st Duke. The barony of Lovaine and earldom of Beverley have since been merged in the dukedom as courtesy titles.

The 5th Duke was succeeded by his eldest son, Algernon, the 6th Duke, who notably served as Lord Privy Seal between 1879 and 1880 under Lord Beaconsfield. The 6th Duke's eldest son, Henry, the 7th Duke, was summoned to the House of lords through a writ of acceleration in his father's junior title of Lord Lovaine in 1887. The 7th Duke's eldest son, Henry Percy, Earl Percy, predeceased him. He was succeeded by his fourth but eldest surviving son, Alan, the 8th Duke, whose eldest son, Henry, the 9th Duke, was killed during the retreat to Dunkirk during the Second World War. Henry was succeeded by his younger brother, Hugh, the 10th Duke. In 1957, on the death of his fourth cousin once removed, James Stewart-Murray, 9th Duke of Atholl, Hugh succeeded as 9th Baron Percy, the title thus re-merging with the Dukedom. As of 2012 the titles are held by his second son, Ralph, the 12th Duke, who succeeded on the death of his elder brother in 1995.  

Other members of the Percy family

Several other members of the Percy family have also gained distinction. Charlotte Percy, Duchess of Northumberland, wife of the third Duke, was governess of the future Queen Victoria. Lord Josceline Percy, second son of the fifth Duke, was a politician. Lord Henry Percy, third son of the fifth Duke, was a soldier. Lord Algernon Percy, second son of the sixth Duke, was a politician. Lord Eustace Percy, seventh son of the seventh Duke, was a politician who was raised to the peerage as Baron Percy of Newcastle in 1953. Jane Percy, Duchess of Northumberland, wife of the twelfth Duke, is Lord-Lieutenant of Northumberland since 2009. See also Earl of Beverley for younger sons of the first Earl of Beverley.

Family residences
The seat of the Dukes of Northumberland is Alnwick Castle, which is located in Alnwick, Northumberland. The family's London residence is Syon House in Brentford, which replaced, as their London residence, the demolished Northumberland House in the Strand. Warkworth and Prudhoe castles were the residences of the Earls of Northumberland in the Middle Ages, and ownership was retained by the later Dukes. Both are now in the custody of English Heritage. Albury Park is a former residence which has been converted into apartments, while the surrounding estate is still directly owned by the Duke. The traditional burial place of the Dukes is the Northumberland Vault in Westminster Abbey in London, the Percys thus being the last family to maintain such a privilege. Their family vault is however nearly full, and a new private graveyard has been created in Hulne Park near Alnwick.

List of titleholders

Dukes of Northumberland; First creation (1551)

Dukes of Northumberland; Second creation (1683)

Earls of Northumberland; Third creation (1749)

Dukes of Northumberland; Third creation (1766)

The heir apparent is the present holder's elder son George Percy, Earl Percy (b. 1984)

Family tree

Coat of arms

Ducal pipers
Since at least the mid 18th century, the family has maintained a Northumbrian piper; the earliest known of these was Joseph Turnbull, who was painted in 1756 playing his pipes; the portrait, entitled Joseph Turnbull, Piper to the Duchess of Northumberland is at Alnwick Castle. At this time, before the Third Creation of the Dukedom, he would actually have been piper to the Countess. A later piper, William Green stated that "Joe Turnbull was the first Piper at Alnwick Castle – that was ever!" A list of the Ducal Pipers is at. The present Ducal Piper is Richard Butler. The piper's main duty is to play at the Shrove Tuesday football match in Alnwick.

Other pipers have been associated less formally with the family – the notorious piper James Allan (1729–1810) was a favourite of the Countess; in the last century Tom Clough and Richard Mowat are known to have played together with the Duke's then piper, James Hall, for the Duke and his guests at Alnwick; one such guest was Edward VII, in 1905.

Named in their honour 

 Northumberland Islands, off Queensland, Australia
 Northumberland Islands National Park, a protected area in Queensland
 Percy Isles, off Queensland, Australia
 Percy Isles National Park, a protected area in Queensland

In popular culture
Sir Henry Percy, popularly known as "Harry Hotspur", is portrayed as a dashing hero by William Shakespeare in his historical play Henry IV, Part One. Sir Henry was the eldest son and heir apparent of the 1st Earl of Northumberland and would have succeeded his father if not for his untimely death at the Battle of Shrewsbury.
Lord Percy Percy, played by Tim McInnerny, is a major character in the first two series of the British sitcom Blackadder. In the first series, he is the Duke of Northumberland, while the Lord Percy in the second series is presumably his descendant and is heir to the dukedom. The first series was partly filmed at Alnwick Castle, the residence and seat of the real Dukes of Northumberland.

See also 

Alnwick Castle – the family's main residence
Alnwick Garden – adjacent to Alnwick Castle
Northumberland House – the family's former residence in central London (demolished in 1874)
Northumbrian tartan
Royal National Lifeboat Institution, in which several dukes played a role in the 19th to 20th centuries
Syon House – the family's Thames-side residence in west London

References

External links

Alnwick Castle website
Alnwick Garden website
European Heraldry page
Northumberland Estates website
Syon House website

Dukedoms in the Peerage of Great Britain
History of Northumberland
Extinct dukedoms in the Peerage of Great Britain
Forfeited dukedoms in the Peerage of England
Extinct dukedoms in the Jacobite Peerage
Noble titles created in 1551
Noble titles created in 1683
Noble titles created in 1716
Noble titles created in 1766